Scott Bar may refer to: 
Scott Bar, California, unincorporated community in Siskiyou County, California
Scott Bar Mountains, mountain range in Siskiyou County, California
Scott Bar salamander, species of salamander